Nadia Georgina Oates (born 26 May 1990) is a former English singer, rapper, producer and model. She was featured on Space Cowboy's 2007 single "My Egyptian Lover". She has since released two studio albums—Hot Like Wow (2008) and Colours (2011)—both entirely produced by Space Cowboy. Since 2012, she has not released any new music and has most likely retired from the music industry.

History

Hot Like Wow, 2007 to 2008
Oh's debut album Hot Like Wow was produced by Space Cowboy and released in the United Kingdom on 13 April 2008 by Tiger Trax Records, with songs featured on the American TV shows Ugly Betty, Gossip Girl and So You Think You Can Dance. On 16 July 2011, the title track "Hot Like Wow" was featured on So You Think You Can Dance for the second time. The album was preceded by three singles: "My Egyptian Lover", "Something 4 The Weekend" and "N.A.D.I.A Oh" from 2007 to 2008. The album was however supported by the release of the single, "Got Your Number", that bought her international attention on the American TV series, Gossip Girl.

Colours, 2009 to 2012
Oh worked once again with Space Cowboy on her second studio album, Colours, released on 8 May 2011. Singles from the album, "Taking Over the Dancefloor" (originally titled "Kate Middleton"), which received airplay on BBC Radio 1's The Scott Mills Show, and "No Bueno", showcase a moombahton style and were named Song of the Day by Popjustice on 21 March and 27 June 2011, respectively. Colours was re-issued in September 2011 to include "No Bueno", "Shade", "I Like It Loud" and "Follow Me".

Oh has been working on new music since mid-late 2011, with two tracks being released on SoundCloud as free downloads so far; "Vampire Night" featuring Space Cowboy and "Fqn Amazing". In early 2012, she released "Slapper (Ayye)" through iTunes however since this she has not released any new material.

2013–present: Hiatus and modelling
Since 2012, Oh has not released any new material despite suggesting otherwise. She has since pursued a career in modelling. It is unclear if Oh plans on returning to music. A demo of a song with singer and producer MNEK dated from 2012 allegedly called "Radio Religion" surfaced online in 2021 but it was never officially released.

Discography

Albums
 Hot Like Wow (2008)
 Colours (2011)

Singles

Promotional singles
 "N.A.D.I.A. O.H." (2008)
 "I Like It Loud" (2011)
 "Shade" (2011)
 "Rip It Up" (2012)

References

External links
 
 
 

1990 births
Electro house musicians
English dance musicians
English electronic musicians
English women pop singers
English women rappers
Grime music artists
Singers from London
Living people
Synth-pop singers
English women in electronic music